Qaisracetus is an extinct protocetid early whale known from the Eocene (Lutetian) of Baluchistan, Pakistan (paleocoordinates ).

Etymology
The genus is named after the Qaisrani Baloch tribe which assisted Gingerich and his team during their field work. "Qaisra" is also etymologically close to the royal title used in Persian and many Indo-European languages (e.g. Kaiser, Czar, Caesar).  The species is named for Muhammad Arif, former paleontologist at the Geological Survey of Pakistan who contributed significantly to archaeocete paleontology in Pakistan.

Description
Qaisracetus is known from a dozen specimens, all found in or near the type locality.  Among them are several well-preserved elements, including a well-preserved skull, partial skulls and braincases, several vertebrae including an almost complete sacrum, a left innominate, ribs, and partial limb elements.

Qaisracetus is smaller than Pappocetus and Babiacetus but larger than Indocetus.

Qaisracetus has a generalized protocetid skull with the external nares located relatively anteriorly (above C1) and a relatively broad frontal shield.
The rostrum is more narrow in Qaisracetus than in Takracetus.

The four sacral vertebrae are only partially fused: the first two are solidly fused, the third is locked in place by rib-like processes (a pleurapophyseal synchondrosis), while the fourth has a caudal (tail-like) morphology including two ventral chevron processes.  The fusion between S1 and S2 distinguished Qaisracetus from other protocetids such as Protocetus, Rodhocetus, Gaviacetus, Natchitochia, and Georgiacetus.  Qaisracetus' vertebrae are not dense and thick like in Eocetus.  In contrast to Qaisracetus, Rodhocetus has a sacrum where non of the vertebrae have fused centra, which is derived to be a protocetid, but Rodhocetus is primitive in retaining pleurapophyseal connections between all sacral vertebrae.  The sacral morphology of Rodhocetus and Qaisracetus indicate protocetids represent a wide range of specializations, although which is ancestral to later whales is unclear.

Notes and references

Bibliography

 

Protocetidae
Fossil taxa described in 2001
Prehistoric cetacean genera
Extinct mammals of Asia